Keep On Moving Straight Ahead is the fifth album by American funk band Lakeside. Released in 1981 on the SOLAR Records label, it contains songs left over from sessions for their previous albums that were recorded while SOLAR was distributed by RCA Records (SOLAR switched distribution from RCA to Elektra Records in 1981). RCA also released similar albums of left over tracks in 1981 for other artists on the SOLAR label.

The album entered the Billboard pop and R&B charts in 1981.

Track listing

Side A

Side B

Personnel
Electric guitar – Stephen Shockley
Bass guitar: Marvin Craig
Clavinet: Norman Beavers, Otis Stokes
Drums: Fred Alexander, Jr.
Congas: Fred Lewis
Percussion: Fred Alexander, Jr., Mark Adam Wood, Jr., Marvin Craig
Piano: Mark Adam Wood, Jr., Norman Beavers, Otis Stokes
Synthesizer: Fred Lewis, Stephen Shockley
Timbales: Fred Lewis
Vocals: Mark Adam Wood, Jr., Otis Stokes, Thomas Shelby, Tiemeyer McCain

Production
Engineers: Bob Brown, Steve Hodge, Taavi Mote
Executive producer: Dick Griffey
Producer: Lakeside
Mastering:  Wally Traugott
Arrangement: Lakeside

Chart performance

References

1981 albums
SOLAR Records albums
Lakeside (band) albums